Jørgen Lindhardsen (born 25 April 1945) is a Danish sailor. He competed in the Finn event at the 1976 Summer Olympics.

References

External links
 

1945 births
Living people
Danish male sailors (sport)
Olympic sailors of Denmark
Sailors at the 1976 Summer Olympics – Finn
People from Nakskov
World champions in sailing for Denmark
OK class world champions
OK class sailors